DSDP may refer to:

 Deep Sea Drilling Project, an ocean drilling project operated from 1968 to 1983
 , a former political party in Poland, formed in 1922